Sugar Spider is a 2002 album by Dutch artist Georgina Verbaan credited on the album as Georgina, her mononym. It was released on Jive Records and is the debut and only studio album by Verbaan.

Track listing
(writers in parenthesis)
"Let's Ride" (A. van Olm) - 3:50	
"New York, Paris, Rome" (A. Volley, M. Vishnudatt) - 4:01
"Denis" (N.M. Levenson) - 3:11	
"Let Me Be The One (Fluitsma & van Tyn) - 3:00	
"Xtremely" (Fluitsma & van Tyn, N. Eweg, X. Hubrecht) - 3:39	
"No More Lies" (E. van Otterdijke) - 3:50	
"Perfect" (M. Nevin) - 3:33	
"Look to the Future" (J. Gordon, L. Dissing) - 4:05	
"Easier Said Than Done" (Fluitsma & van Tyn, G. Verbaan, N. Eweg) - 3:06	
"99 Luftballons" (C. Karges, Fahrenkrog-Petersen) - 3:14	
"Ritmo" (M. Schimmer) - 3:22 (bonus track)
"Yo quiero bailar" - (T. Ten, X. Ten - lyrics in English by M. Schimmer) - 3:44 (bonus track)	
"Love Is On  Way" (M. Schimmer) - 3:31 (bonus track)	

Music videos
"Ritmo"		
"Yo quiero bailar"

Singles
The charting singles from the album were:
"If You Want Me" 
"Ritmo" (featuring Janet)
"Yo quiero bailar"
"Denis"

Charts

References

2002 debut albums